Playlist Studio, better known as Playlist, is a South Korean web drama production company known for producing independent video content and can expand its business to various areas such as performances, webtoons, music sources, and games by using intellectual property rights (IP). It is also known for its several hit web dramas including Love Playlist, Seventeen, A-Teen, and Weak Hero Class 1. The production mainly focuses on the 10s and 20s aged audience and a time limit running time within 10 minutes (or a maximum of 20 minutes).

As of June 2021, Sports Seoul reported that the Playlist Original has over 2.6 million subscribers and has the number of subscribers to all Playlist channels (Playlist Indonesia, Playlist Japan and Playlist Vietnam) exceeded 14.6 million.

Logo
The second Playlist Studio's logo was introduced in August 2020 to lead a fun and playful pop culture by creating content that empathizes and move people and the world.

History

In January 2017, Playlist was established for Snow app promotion by a joint investment from Snow Corp. and Line Webtoon, which are subsidiaries of Naver Corporation and is led by CEO Park Tae-won who has worked for Google Korea and Google Japan. In May of the same year, it decided to separate and build a new company after seeing their first web drama Love Playlist gained huge popularity after word of mouth among college students after it first aired in March 2017. The drama went on for four seasons and ended with total views for the four seasons exceeded 630 million views.

Playlist Global (stylized as PlayList Global) is a global service platform promoting through Facebook, Naver TV and YouTube providing subtitle services in 10 countries, including English, Japanese, French, Chinese, and Indonesian. The production company introduces it as a 'mobile broadcasting station' in the official Facebook account, saying, "I believe that TV will move to mobile, just as PC has moved to mobile."

In December 2018, Playlist positioning itself as a music video content producer as it established a music channel, Mu:Ply (stylized in all caps).

In September 2019, Playlist acquired a 3.63% (172 shares) stake in Sublime Artist Agency for 301 million won on the 20th. The acquisition amount is equivalent to 41.44% of the company's equity capital as of the end of 2018.

In October 2019, Playlist had attracted an investment of 5.3 billion won from a Silicon Valley-based venture capital (VC), Altos Ventures.

In February 2020, former Studio Dragon chief producer (CP) Yoon Hyun-gi joined Playlist Studio as head PD for its drama division.

In May 2020, Playlist signed a memorandum of understanding (MOU) with LG U+, a South Korean telecommunication company to jointly produce and distribute short-form 5G contents such as web dramas for VR, AR music videos, and 3D PPL by combining LG U+ VR and AR technology with the contents produced by Playlist.

In August 2020, Playlist underwent its first rebrand and renewed its CI and BI in three years, introducing a new logo, the brand slogan 'Play your story' and brand core values 'Empathy', 'Pleasure', 'Leading' and 'Growth' and business areas such as drama, music, commerce, such as Playlist original, Teenply, Mu:Ply, Playlist developed playlist store and Playlist style to reflect the brand system.

Content creators
Playlist started with a small number of 2 writers, 2-3 directors, and a designer. In 2019, Playlist has about 90 young creators with more than half of the total is people in their 20s, and 70% of them are content creators such as writers, directors, producers, and designers. According to CEO Park, "Writers are discovered through contests. Neither writers nor directors are selected based on their past experiences because people in their twenties themselves are not yet inexperienced." He also emphasized that the content development project are done through the collective intelligence of the majority that decision-making and judgment of a few.

Growth

User statistics
In 2018, Playlist's subscribers surpassed 3.19 million on Facebook and 950,000 on YouTube. The release of Love Playlist 1 & 2, it garnered over 300 million views and 70% of the main traffic is female from both the domestic and international channel. As the show progresses, it surpassed 1 million views each time the episode was uploaded on YouTube.

By April 2019, Playlist had over 1.3 billion global views and 7.7 million subscribers worldwide. It sold 45,000 items such as beauty products, stationery and miscellaneous goods in five weeks and 10,000 exports in two weeks. With the release of A-Teen 2 first on Naver TV before other platforms such as YouTube, the platform is also effective in securing platform users. Before the pre-release of the drama, Playlist videos' average number of views was around 20,000 to 30,000 on the platform. Later, the views exceeded 2 million when it was released.

By December 2019, Playlist recorded 2 billion cumulative views domestically and abroad, such as Japan, Taiwan, and Vietnam. The average number of views per episode is about 2-5 million.

In June 2021, XX, Ending Again, In Seoul 2, Pop out boy!, Twenty-Twenty, Live On, My Fuxxxxx Romance, and Growing Season received the highest proportion of viewers aged between 18 and 24. The proportion of viewers aged 18–24 for the eight works averaged about 43%. However, XX, My Fuxxxxx Romance, and Growing Season have the second-highest proportion of viewers aged 25–34 (21%, 27%, and 16%, respectively), covering a wide audience from teens to 30s. In addition, My fuxxxxx Romance broke the prejudice that male viewers accounted for 56% of the total, and that dramas were exclusively for female viewers.

According to data collected in June 2021, Playlist dramas are watched through smartphones (80%), PCs (11%), tablets (6.6%), TVs (1.01%), and game consoles (0.1%). Playlist has achieved 3.1 billion global views and 14 million subscribers worldwide in four years since its launch.

Contents release through V Live
In 2019, Naver's video platform V Live opened its membership platform in April for A-Teen 2. It is the first drama to open a channel other than artists such as idol singers and actors. The drama video was released one week ahead of other platforms with no ads, 3 special live videos of A-Teen 2, text and photo content, and members-only bulletin boards are also provided. Other drama release through V Live are Love Playlist 4, Just One Bite 2, and In Seoul 1 and 2.

Reception
Due to the domestic and international success of Yellow (2017), the drama held a 2-hour fan meeting on November 4, 2017, at the White Wave Art Center in Seoul with a performance by Car, the Garden and MeloMance. A-Teen'''s (2018-2019) popularity has resulted in the webtoons and script books being created. The lipstick collaboration with A-Teen became popular, selling 60,000 in Korea and Japan. In addition, the character Do Ha-na led to an explosive response from viewers. Through CEO Park words: During the character planning and development, Do Ha-na is focused on a character that does what teenagers want to do. Through interviews with teenagers, I studied how they felt in what situations and how they felt and reflected that into the main character's personality. The actor who played the character Shin Ye-eun, swept advertisements for 10 brands, and is emerging as a new 'Advertising Queen'. In addition, Kim Dong-hee (played as Ha Min) was cast in JTBC's high-rated drama SKY Castle and is continuing his acting career.

Plyverse
Plyverse is a portmanteau of the words Playlist and Universe'' a non-narrative name given to the fictional setting of the television series produced by Playlist Studio. The term is used to link characters seen across secondary contents, such as collaborations and spin-offs, by organically connecting and integrating each work based on a common worldview.

Original programming

Movie

Drama

Entertainment

Music

Soundtracks

Others

Merchandise

Brand

Notes

References

External links
 
 
 
 

 
Naver Corporation
Companies based in Seoul
2017 establishments in South Korea
Multilingual websites
Internet television streaming services
Television production companies of South Korea